Ansio is a station on line 2 of the Bilbao metro. It is located in the neighborhood of Arteagabeitia-Zuazu, in the municipality of Barakaldo. The station is located next to the main entrance to the Bilbao Exhibition Centre (BEC). The main Customer Attention Offices for line 2 are also located in this station. It opened on 13 April 2002.

Station layout 
Unlike other underground stations in the network, and similarly to Sarriko station, the station does not follow a cavern-like design, but it is instead made up of a big single space, with a big shelter that allows sunlight in.

Access 

  Ansio St. (BEC exit)
   Station's interior (BEC exit)
   BEC Parking
   BEC Park & Ride

Services 
The station is served by line 2 from Basauri to Kabiezes. The station is also served by Bizkaibus regional bus services and Kbus, the municipal bus service.

References

External links
 

Line 2 (Bilbao metro) stations
Railway stations in Spain opened in 2002
2002 establishments in the Basque Country (autonomous community)
Barakaldo